Plinia spirito-santensis, commonly known as  (hairy cross jaboticaba) or Grimal in the United States, is a species of plant in the family Myrtaceae. It is endemic to broad-leafed coastal forests, at altitude, in eastern Brazil. The plant is a semideciduous shrub or small tree which can grow to between 3 and 6 metres tall. It produces edible deep reddish-purple berries, up to 30mm in diameter. At the apex of the fruit there is a small cross, from which the name derives.

In the US, this species is commonly named after Adolf Grimal, who collected this variety in South America and introduced it to Florida.

References

spirito-santensis
Endemic flora of Brazil
Crops originating from the Americas
Crops originating from Brazil
Tropical fruit
Fruits originating in South America
Cauliflory
Fruit trees
Berries